The 1884 Texas gubernatorial election was held to elect the Governor of Texas. John Ireland was re-elected over former U.S. Representative George Washington "Wash" Jones, an independent with Greenback support, and Republican newspaper publisher Anthony Banning Norton.

General election

Candidates
John Ireland, incumbent Governor (Democratic)
George Washington Jones, former U.S. Representative from Bastrop (Independent)
Anthony Banning Norton, newspaper publisher (Republican)

Results

References

1884
Texas
1884 Texas elections